Ilona Poljakova (born 1 April 1973) is an Estonian former professional tennis player.

Born and raised in Pärnu, Poljakova studied at Virginia Commonwealth University in the United States, where she played collegiate tennis before joining the professional tour. She was a member of the Estonia Fed Cup team between 1999 and 2005, appearing in a total of 11 ties, for two singles and four doubles wins.

After retiring from the professional tennis, Poljakova became a beach tennis player.

ITF finals

Singles: 3 (0–3)

Doubles: 3 (1–2)

References

External links

 
 
 

1973 births
Living people
Estonian female tennis players
Female tennis players playing beach tennis
Sportspeople from Pärnu
VCU Rams athletes
College women's tennis players in the United States